The Pines is a locality in the Toowoomba Region, Queensland, Australia.

Geography 
The land use is rural residential with large acreage blocks.

Education 
There are no schools in The Pines. The nearest primary and secondary school to Year 10 is in Millmerran and the nearest secondary school to Year 12 in is Pittsworth.

References 

Toowoomba Region
Localities in Queensland